Lee Shih-tsung (1898 – 15 May 1972), courtesy name Yinqiao, art name Wuzhen, was a Taiwanese politician who served as the 2nd President of the Control Yuan from 1964 to 1972 (acting from 1964 to 1965 due to the death of Yu Youren).

Biography 
Lee Shih-tsung was born in 1898. In 1923, he graduated from the Department of Physics of Peking University. Soon after, Lee joined the Kuomintang and handled party affairs in Shanxi.

In 1934, he became a member of the Control Yuan. In 1948, Lee was re-elected to the Control Yuan, and escaped to Taiwan the following year. In 1958, he became the vice-president of the Control Yuan, and in 1965, officially became the president of the Control Yuan.

Lee died of a heart attack in 1972.

References 

1898 births
1972 deaths
Republic of China politicians from Hebei
Kuomintang politicians in Taiwan
Taiwanese Presidents of the Control Yuan
Peking University alumni